Michael Schwan (born 5 November 1939) is a German rower who competed for the United Team of Germany in the 1964 Summer Olympics.

In 1964, he won the bronze medal with his partner Wolfgang Hottenrott in the coxless pairs event.

References

External links
 

1939 births
Living people
Olympic rowers of the United Team of Germany
Rowers at the 1964 Summer Olympics
Olympic bronze medalists for the United Team of Germany
Olympic medalists in rowing
World Rowing Championships medalists for West Germany
Medalists at the 1964 Summer Olympics
West German male rowers
European Rowing Championships medalists